= Avros =

Russian masculine given name

Avros (Russian: Авро́с) is a Russian male first name. It was included into various, often handwritten, church calendars throughout the 17th–19th centuries, but was omitted from the official Synodal Menologium at the end of the 19th century. It is derived from the Latin word meaning rich in gold, golden.
